Aglaura may refer to:

Aglaura (play), a play by Sir John Suckling set in Persia
An alternative name for the Greek mythological figures called Aglaulus
Aglaura (genus), a genus of hydrozoans in the family Rhopalonematidae 
Nessaea aglaura, a species of brush-footed butterfly of the genus Nessaea